Caroline Quentin (born Caroline Jones; 11 July 1960) is an English actress, broadcaster and television presenter. Quentin became known for her television appearances: portraying Dorothy in Men Behaving Badly (1992–1998), Maddie Magellan in Jonathan Creek (1997–2000), and DCI Janine Lewis in Blue Murder (2003–2009).

Early life
Quentin was born in Reigate, Surrey, to Kathleen Jones and her husband Fred, a Royal Air Force pilot. She has three older sisters. She was educated at the independent Arts Educational School, in Tring, Hertfordshire, and appeared locally in the Pendley Open Air Shakespeare Festival.

Career

Television
One of her earliest roles was in the Channel 4 comedy drama Hollywood Hits Chiswick, alongside Derek Newark as W.C. Fields.

Between 1992 and 1998, Quentin appeared as Dorothy in all 42 episodes of the sitcom Men Behaving Badly. From 1997 until 2000, Quentin starred alongside Alan Davies in Jonathan Creek playing investigative journalist Maddie Magellan, who uses Jonathan's mind to solve murder mysteries. In 1998 she starred in the first sitcom that was specifically built around her: Kiss Me Kate; that year she started the major role of Maggie Mee in the drama Life Begins, which returned for a third series in 2006. Quentin appeared in the television film Hot Money (2001), which was based on the true story of the theft of hundreds of thousands of pounds from the Bank of England.

ITV has produced five series of the police drama Blue Murder, in which Quentin plays against type in the main role DCI Janine Lewis. The pilot aired in the UK on 18 May 2003.

Quentin has appeared in Whose Line Is It Anyway?; in a pre-Men Behaving Badly role as a traffic warden in the Mr. Bean episode "The Trouble with Mr. Bean" in 1991; Room 101; Have I Got News for You; and the 2009–10 BBC comedy series Life of Riley, a sitcom about a dysfunctional blended family; and in the BBC Radio 4 improvisational comedy series The Masterson Inheritance, the Radio 4 comedy Any Bloke (starred with Jim Sweeney who was also in The Masterson Inheritance) and the popular BBC Radio 2 sitcom On the Blog. She appeared as Heather Babcock in an episode of Agatha Christie's Miss Marple, The Mirror Crack'd from Side to Side, in 2010. Also in 2010 she started appearing, as a 1970's standard lamp, in Marks & Spencer's revamped food range advertisements.

In March 2011, a documentary entitled Caroline Quentin: A Passage Through India aired on ITV in the UK. The documentary followed Quentin as she traveled from the North of India to the South. Quentin presented Restoration Home on BBC Two. The programme looks into the history and families of the UK's derelict mansion houses which are being restored by their private owners. In 2012, Quentin began working on another documentary series, Cornwall with Caroline Quentin, which shows her travelling across Cornwall, for which she received some criticism due to apparently aiming the show at potential second home owners. She returned to present a second series of the show in 2013. In 2013, she hosted  another documentary series, Caroline Quentin’s National Parks for one series. Quentin starred in the Comedy Central series Big Bad World where she played the role of Jan, the mother of the main character Ben (Blake Harrison).

In 2015, she played the role of Angela Sim in an episode of Doc Martin. She played the role of Mrs Bumble in Dickensian (2015–2016). In November 2016, she guest presented an episode of The One Show.

Starting in 2017, Quentin was co-presenter of the BBC Two programme The World's Most Extraordinary Homes with architect Piers Taylor; 12 episodes were completed and aired. Subsequently, the series streamed on Netflix.

In 2020, Quentin participated in the eighteenth series of Strictly Come Dancing. She was partnered with Johannes Radebe. Quentin became the fourth celebrity to be voted off on 22 November 2020. Quentin later commented,"I have had the honour and privilege of working with some of the greatest dancers this country has ever known I mean I really believe it, I think they are absolutely fantastic."

Theatre
In 2019, she played Lady Fancyfull in the Royal Shakespeare Company production of The Provoked Wife. Her early stage work had also included appearing in the chorus of the original English production of the musical Les Misérables in 1985. In 2022 she played Mrs Malaprop in the Royal National Theatre's production of Jack Absolute Flies Again.

Music
In July 1996, Quentin released a single, a cover of the Exciters' hit "Tell Him", with her Men Behaving Badly co-star Leslie Ash under the name of "Quentin and Ash". The single spent 3 weeks in the UK Singles Chart, reaching number 25.

Recognition
Quentin received an Ian Charleson Award commendation for her Masha in The Seagull at the Oxford Theatre Company in 1991.

At the British Comedy Awards in 2004, Quentin won the "Best Comedy Actress" award for her performance in Von Trapped

Personal life
Quentin was married to comedian Paul Merton from 1990 until their 1998 divorce.

Quentin met Sam Farmer in 1998 on the set of Men Behaving Badly, where he was a runner. The couple have two children, Emily Rose and William. In 2006, she married Farmer in Tiverton, Devon. They lived briefly in Morebath Manor near the village of Morebath, Devon, close to Tiverton, before moving to a smaller derelict farm nearby, which they renovated. Before moving to Devon, the couple lived at Walberswick, Suffolk.

Quentin has coeliac disease and is the patron of Coeliac UK. She is also president of the charity Campaign for National Parks.

Filmography

Film

Television

Awards
British Comedy Awards
1995, Best TV Comedy Actress (Men Behaving Badly, as Dorothy)
2004, Top TV Comedy Actress (Von Trapped, as Maria Moogan; Life Begins, as Maggie Mee)

National Television Awards
2004, Special Recognition Award

Other
2012 Specsavers National Book Awards, Audiobook of the Year, winner as narrator of The Woman Who Went to Bed for a Year by Sue Townsend

See also
 List of people diagnosed with coeliac disease

References

External links

Amanda Howard Associates

1960 births
Living people
English film actresses
English television actresses
People educated at Tring Park School for the Performing Arts
People from Reigate
People from Walberswick
English women comedians
Actresses from Surrey
20th-century English actresses
21st-century English actresses
British comedy actresses